Vitrinula is a genus of air-breathing land snails, terrestrial pulmonate gastropod mollusks in the family Ariophantidae. Vitrinula is the type genus of the Vitrinulini, that is a synonym of Macrochlamydinae.

Species 
The genus Vitrinula includes the following species:
 Vitrinula chaunax
 Vitrinula chichijimana
 Vitrinula hahajimana

References 

Ariophantidae
Taxonomy articles created by Polbot